East Palmyra Presbyterian Church is a historic Presbyterian church located at East Palmyra in Wayne County, New York.  It is a vernacular Romanesque style brick and stone church built in 1868–1869.  The front facade features a square tower composed of stone capped brick buttresses, a belfry articulated by brick pilasters and corbelled brick trim, and a tall, octagonal spire.

It was listed on the National Register of Historic Places in 2002.

References

External links

Churches on the National Register of Historic Places in New York (state)
Presbyterian churches in New York (state)
Churches completed in 1869
Churches in Wayne County, New York
1869 establishments in New York (state)
National Register of Historic Places in Wayne County, New York